Gone to Earth is the eighth studio album by the English rock group Barclay James Harvest released in 1977.

Background
"Poor Man's Moody Blues" was written after a journalist angered the band by referring to Barclay James Harvest as a "poor man's Moody Blues". In response, guitarist John Lees wrote a song which sounded like the Moody Blues song "Nights in White Satin", but in fact was cleverly not the same - the words would not fit. Justin Hayward was not pleased; meeting him years later, bassist Les Holroyd apologised for it.

Other songs on the album deal with subjects like ended relationships ("Friend of Mine"), alienation ("Leper's Song") the exploitation of animals for their fur ("Spirit on the Water") and the space race ("Sea of Tranquility").

The album's title, Gone to Earth, refers to the fox hunter's cry used to indicate that the quarry has returned to its lair.

The original LP version of the album, designed by Maldwyn Tootill, featured die-cut outer cover and full-color inner album sleeve. On one side of the inner sleeve was an owl (as shown in the picture); on the other side was a picture of a sunset. The inner sleeve could be reversed so that either side would be displayed through the die cut.

Reception
Gone to Earth reached #30 in the UK Albums Chart; in Germany it peaked at #10 and stayed for 197 weeks in the German album charts. As of 2011 it is ranked #6 on the list of longest running albums in the German album charts. Only the My Fair Lady soundtrack and albums by Simon & Garfunkel (Greatest Hits), The Beatles (1962–1966), Pink Floyd (Wish You Were Here) and Andrea Berg (Best Of) spent more weeks in the charts. It was the band's largest selling album, eventually selling more than a million copies worldwide.

Hymn (often misinterpreted as a Christian song but actually a song against the dangers of drug use and dedicated to musicians like Jimi Hendrix, Paul Kossoff and Janis Joplin) was a successful turntable hit at German radio stations in the late 1970s.

Track listing

Personnel
Barclay James Harvest
John Lees – vocals, guitars
Les Holroyd – vocals, bass, guitars, keyboards
Stuart "Woolly" Wolstenholme – vocals, mellotron, keyboards
Mel Pritchard – drums, percussion

Charts

Weekly charts

Year-end charts

Certifications and sales

References

External links
Information about the album

1977 albums
Barclay James Harvest albums
Polydor Records albums
Albums recorded at Strawberry Studios